Jose Pablo Cantillo (born March 30, 1979) is an American actor. He is best known for playing Ricky Verona in Crank, Miguel in Cleaner (2007), Pepe in Streets of Blood (2011), Detective Martinez in El Chicano (2018), Hector Salazar in FX's Sons of Anarchy, Caesar Martinez in AMC's The Walking Dead, Duff in Standoff, and Dave in Taken (2017).

Early life
The son of Costa Rican parents, Roberto Cantillo and Rita Bolaños, Jose Pablo Cantillo (known as "Joey" in his high school days) was born in Marshfield, Wisconsin. He grew up in Terre Haute, Indiana and attended Terre Haute South Vigo High School where he was a tennis standout for all four years, leading the Terre Haute South Braves to a State Runner-Up finish in 1996. He graduated from Indiana University Bloomington in 2003 with a double major in marketing and finance from the Kelley School of Business.

Career
Cantillo decided to pursue an acting career in New York City after taking some drama classes at IU. In late 2003, he moved to California.

After acting in Off-Broadway plays in New York, Cantillo has landed guest roles on popular television series since early 2000. He played a recurring role in The Walking Dead as Caesar Martinez, and roles in two of Neill Blomkamp's films, the science fiction action thriller Elysium (2013) and Chappie (2015). In 2019, he played the role of Detective Martinez in the "Latino superhero movie" El Chicano.

Personal life
In late 2003, Cantillo moved to California with his wife Kristi and their 7-year-old daughter. They live in Santa Clarita, a town that Cantillo described to an interviewer as “kind of reminds us of Terre Haute”, his hometown.

Filmography

Film

Television

References

External links

Jose Pablo Cantillo Online
José Pablo Cantillo Fan Love

American male film actors
American male television actors
Hispanic and Latino American male actors
Kelley School of Business alumni
Male actors from Indiana
Actors from Terre Haute, Indiana
People from Marshfield, Wisconsin
1979 births
Living people
Male actors from Santa Clarita, California
American people of Costa Rican descent
Male actors from Wisconsin
21st-century American male actors
American male stage actors